The 2017 Big Sky Conference men's basketball tournament was the 42nd edition of the postseason tournament for the Big Sky Conference, held March 7–11 at the Reno Events Center in Reno, Nevada.

In the final, regular season champion North Dakota defeated third-seed Weber State  in overtime to earn the conference's automatic bid to the NCAA tournament. It was North Dakota's first NCAA tournament as a Division I team, after multiple appearances in the Division II tourney.

On October 8, 2016, Northern Colorado self-imposed a post-season ban amid an ongoing NCAA investigation into program violations, and did not participate.

Seeds
Only 11 of the 12 teams in the conference participated in the tournament due to Northern Colorado's self-imposed ban. Teams were seeded by conference record, with a tiebreaker system used to seed teams with identical conference records. The top five teams received a first round bye.

Schedule

Bracket

* denotes overtime period

NCAA tournament
The Fighting Hawks received the automatic bid to the NCAA tournament; no other Big Sky members were invited to the tournament or  North Dakota was seeded fifteenth in the West regional and lost 100–82 to Arizona in the first round  It was the eleventh consecutive year that the Big Sky representative lost in the first round.

References

External links

Tournament
Big Sky Conference men's basketball tournament
Basketball competitions in Reno, Nevada
Big Sky Conference men's basketball tournament
Big Sky Conference men's basketball tournament
College sports tournaments in Nevada